Capital of Andhra Pradesh may refer to:
 Amaravati, legislative capital and de facto capital of Andhra Pradesh
 Hyderabad, de jure capital of Andhra Pradesh
 Kurnool, judicial capital of Andhra Pradesh
 Visakhapatnam, executive capital of Andhra Pradesh